The 2010 United States Senate election in Arkansas took place on November 2, 2010 alongside other elections to the United States Senate in other states, as well as elections to the United States House of Representatives and various state and local elections.

Incumbent Democratic U.S. Senator Blanche Lincoln ran for re-election to a third term, facing a strong primary challenge from Lieutenant Governor Bill Halter and prevailing only in a runoff. However, the general election was won by U.S. Representative John Boozman, the younger brother of Fay Boozman whom Lincoln defeated in 1998. Boozman became the first Republican since Reconstruction to win this seat. Lincoln's 21% margin of defeat was the largest for a sitting senator in 32 years.

Democratic primary 
The Democratic primary was held on May 18, 2010, with early voting from May 3 to 17. Lincoln was challenged by Lieutenant Governor Bill Halter, who ran as a more liberal alternative. As no candidate received 50 percent of the vote, a runoff election was held on June 8, with early voting from June 1 to 7. Lincoln managed to narrowly defeat Halter in the runoff.

MoveOn.org supported Halter, criticizing Lincoln for her stance on issues such as health care and environmental regulations. Labor unions also backed Halter, and pledged to spend more than $3 million on his campaign.

Candidates

Declared
 Bill Halter, incumbent Lieutenant Governor of Arkansas
 Blanche Lincoln, incumbent U.S. Senator
 D.C. Morrison, businessman

Polling

Results

Runoff

Polling

Results

Republican primary 
The Republican primary was held on May 18, 2010, with early voting from May 3–17.

Candidates

Declared
 Randy Alexander, University of Arkansas Housing Director and vice chair of the Washington County Tea Party
 Gilbert Baker, state senator
 John Boozman, optometrist and U.S. Representative for Arkansas's 3rd congressional district
 Curtis Coleman, businessman
 Kim Hendren, minority leader of the Arkansas Senate
 Jim Holt, former state senator, nominee for this U.S. Senate in 2004, and nominee for Lieutenant Governor of Arkansas in 2006
 Fred Ramey, real estate investment company owner
 Conrad Reynolds, retired U.S. Army colonel

Straw poll
In December 2009, a straw poll was held for the current Republican candidates for U.S. Senate. The results were as follows:

 Gilbert Baker – 35%
 Curtis Coleman – 33%
 Conrad Reynolds – 23%
 Tom Cox – 4%
 Kim Hendren – 2%
 Fred Ramey – 2%
 Buddy Rogers – 1%

Polling

Results

General election

Candidates 
 John Boozman, U.S. representative
 Blanche Lincoln, incumbent senator
 Trevor Drown (L), military veteran
 John Gray (G), Mayor of Greenland

Campaign 
Arkansas had previously only elected one Republican senator since the Reconstruction, Tim Hutchinson who was defeated after his first term in 2002 by Mark Pryor. Lincoln faced Lieutenant Governor Bill Halter and narrowly won the primary contest.

The political blog FiveThirtyEight ranked Lincoln the most vulnerable senator of this electoral cycle. RealClearPolitics claimed that in 2010 Lincoln had the potential for the lowest percentage of the vote for any incumbent since the nation first began directly electing senators. Boozman received 58% of the vote in the general election and defeated Lincoln (37%), Independent Trevor Drown (3%) and Green John Gray (2%).

Lincoln heavily criticized Boozman for supporting the FairTax and privatization of Social Security. She released an advertisement touting her support for earmarks.

Debates 

Lincoln and Boozman agreed to two debates.

 September 10: At the Peabody Hotel in Little Rock.

Predictions

Fundraising

Polling 

with Bill Halter

Results

See also 
 2010 Arkansas elections
 2010 United States House of Representatives elections in Arkansas
 2010 Arkansas gubernatorial election

References

External links 
 Arkansas Secretary of State - Elections
 U.S. Congress candidates for Arkansas at Project Vote Smart
 Arkansas U.S. Senate 2010 from OurCampaigns.com
 Campaign contributions from Open Secrets
 2010 Arkansas Senate General Election: All Head-to-Head Matchups graph of multiple polls from Pollster.com
 Election 2010: Arkansas Senate from Rasmussen Reports
 2010 Arkansas Senate Race from Real Clear Politics
 2010 Arkansas Senate Race from CQ Politics
 Race profile from The New York Times
Debates
 Arkansas Senate Democratic Primary Debate, C-SPAN, April 23, 2010
 Arkansas Senate debate excerpts, OnTheIssues.org
Official campaign sites
 Randy Alexander for U.S. Senate
 Gilbert Baker for U.S. Senate
 John Boozman for U.S. Senate
 Curtis Coleman for U.S. Senate
 Tom Cox for U.S. Senate
 Trevor Drown for U.S. Senate
 Bill Halter for U.S. Senate
 Kim Hendren for U.S. Senate
 Jim Holt for U.S. Senate
 Blanche Lincoln for U.S. Senate incumbent
 Fred Ramey for U.S. Senate
 Colonel Conrad Reynolds for U.S. Senate
 Buddy Roger for U.S. Senate

2010 Arkansas elections
Arkansas
2010